Sembcorp Marine Limited , also known as Sembmarine, is a Singaporean company. It is listed on the Singapore Exchange (SGX). It was a subsidiary of Sembcorp until 2020, when the companies demerged following Sembcorp Marine's poor financial performance. Its stock value has plummeted continuously over the past decade, from SG$4.66 in 2013 to SG$0.13 in 2023. It has earned a reputation as one of the worst-performing companies on the Singapore Exchange 

Sembcorp Marine's products and services include rigs & floaters, repairs & upgrades, offshore platforms and specialised shipbuilding. It conducts its businesses globally through shipyards in Singapore, Indonesia, the United Kingdom and Brazil.

History 
In October 2017, Sembcorp Marine won a $490m contract for the construction of a new floating production storage and offloading hull and living quarters with Statoil Petroleum AS. In November of the same year, it announced a collaboration with DNV GL, A*Star's Singapore Institute of Manufacturing Technology and the National Additive Manufacturing Innovation Cluster to  develop drones, additive manufacturing and digital twin technologies.

On 5 September 2018, Sembcorp Marine acquired the intellectual property of Sevan Marine, specialized marine engineering and design house. Its acquisition consisted of interests and titles to all of Sevan Marine ASA’S intellectual property, and 95% of shares of HiLoad LNG AS, for a cash consideration of $39 million. In April 2019, Semborp Marine was given the Offshore & Marine Engineering Award in the Singapore International Maritime Centre Awards 2019, and in May of the same year, Sembcorp Marine revealed The Sleipnir¸ the world's largest crane vessel (which cost around US$1.5 billion).

In March 2020, it was announced that Sembcorp, the then-parent company of Sembcorp Marine, was replacing their CEO, an action which is often taken due to adverse events, and can have negative effects on a company's performance and valuation. Sembcorp failed to declare an interim dividend for 1H 2020 (as is usual practice), instead choosing to defer any decision regarding payment of dividends for the fiscal year 2020 until the end of the year. In June of the same year, trading was halted for Sembcorp as well as Sembcorp Marine (the latter of which had its shares decline by 36% in 2020).
 Representatives from both companies declined to comment. The companies were subsequently demerged. Between June 11 and July 24, 2020, Sembcorp Industries' share price declined by 11%. In September 2020, Shell postponed a major contract to Sembcorp Marine for an oil rig in the US Gulf of Mexico to 2021, citing economic uncertainty caused by the COVID-19 pandemic.

On 8 June 2020, it was reported that Temasek stepped in to support Sembcorp Marine's $1.5 billion rights issue  Sembcorp Marine has also been involved in corruption probes in Brazil. The charges were in connection with certain drilling rig construction contracts entered into by Sembcorp Marine's subsidiaries in Brazil back in 2012.

On February 28 2023, Sembcorp Marine completed its acquisition of Keppel Corporation's Offshore & Marine division for $3.34 billion.

References

External links 
 Sembcorp Marine

1963 establishments in Singapore
Companies listed on the Singapore Exchange
Multinational companies headquartered in Singapore
Shipbuilding companies of Singapore
Singaporean brands
Singaporean companies established in 1963